Orešković, Oreskovic or Oreskovich is a Croatian surname.

It is the third most common surname in the Lika-Senj County of Croatia.

It may refer to:

 Alesha Oreskovich, American model
 Božidar Orešković, Croatian actor
 Dalija Orešković, Croatian lawyer and politician
 Dejan Orešković, Croatian musician
 Marko Orešković, Croatian partisan commander
 Phil Oreskovic, Canadian ice hockey player of Croatian descent
 Tihomir Orešković, Croatian businessman and politician
 Tihomir Orešković (officer), Croatian army officer and war criminal
 Victor Oreskovich, Canadian ice hockey player of Croatian descent

References

Croatian surnames